The Surveyor General of Malaysia was the head of the Federated Malay States Survey Department, now known as Department of Survey and Mapping Malaysia.

The first Surveyor General, Colonel Hugh Milbourne Jackson, took up the role on 25 September 1908, and on 1 January 1909 his responsibility was expanded to include the four State Revenue Survey Departments (Perak, Selangor, Negeri Sembilan and Pahang) with the Trigonometrical Survey Department. Topographic Branch was formed in 1910, the organisation expanded to five other unfederated states (Johore, Kedah, Perlis, Kelantan and Terengganu) in between 1910 to 1926.  The organisation added Straits Settlement Survey Department (Penang, Malacca and Singapore) in 1920. The Department continued to operate until Malaysia was formed in 1963, when it became the Department of Survey and Mapping headed by a Director General. There were eleven surveyor generals from 1908 until 1963.

List of Surveyor Generals

References